Halieutichthys is a fish genus in the family Ogcocephalidae.

Species
There are currently four recognized species in this genus:

References

Ogcocephalidae
Marine fish genera
Taxa named by Felipe Poey